Meragang Sixth Form Centre is a sixth form college located in Kampong Meragang, Brunei Darussalam. Known locally by its acronym, PTEM offers Cambridge International Examinations AS-level examinations at the end of students' first year, or the following May/June, and A-level examinations in the October/November of the second.

Opened in 2009, PTEM became the new campus for the former Pusat Tingkatan Enam Berakas, previously located in Lambak Kiri. PTEM is a government institution administered by the Brunei Ministry of Education. Kampong Meragang is located along the Tutong-Muara Highway approximately 24 km from the capital Bandar Seri Begawan.

PTEM currently serves 850 students with a teaching faculty of 110 local and international staff.

See also 

List of schools in Brunei

References 

http://www.moe.gov.bn/SitePages/Government.aspx
https://web.archive.org/web/20160521073642/http://www.bt.com.bn/news-national/2016/05/18/27-students-among-world%E2%80%99s-best
https://web.archive.org/web/20160520231030/http://www.bt.com.bn/news-national/2016/05/18/dance-contestraises-awarenesson-ethnic-groups

External links 
 PTEM Official Website
 Ministry of Education Brunei

Sixth form colleges in Brunei
Cambridge schools in Brunei
Educational institutions established in 2009
2009 establishments in Brunei